New Munster was an early original European name for the South Island of New Zealand, given by the Governor of New Zealand, Captain William Hobson, in honour of Munster, the Irish province in which he was born.

Province

When New Zealand was separated from the Colony of New South Wales in 1841 and established as a colony in its own right, the Royal Charter of 1840 effecting this provided that "the principal Islands, heretofore known as, or commonly called, the 'Northern Island', the 'Middle Island', and 'Stewart's Island', shall henceforward be designated and known respectively as 'New Ulster', 'New Munster', and 'New Leinster'". These divisions were at first of geographical significance only, not used as a basis for the government of the colony, which was centralised in Auckland. New Munster referred solely to the South Island.

The situation was altered in 1846 when the New Zealand Constitution Act 1846 divided the colony into two provinces: New Ulster and New Munster. New Munster included the South Island and Stewart Island, plus the southern portion of the North Island up to the mouth of the Patea River.   New Ulster consisted of the remainder of the North Island. These boundaries incorporated the Cook Strait settlements of Wellington and Nelson into one province, despite being on different islands. Each province had a Governor and Legislative and Executive Council, in addition to the Governor-in-Chief and Legislative and Executive Council for the whole colony. Early in 1848 Edward John Eyre was appointed Lieutenant-Governor of New Munster.

The Provincial Council of New Munster had only one legislative session, in 1849, before it succumbed to the virulent attacks of the Wellington settlers. Governor George Grey, sensible to the pressures, inspired an ordinance of the General Legislative Council under which new Legislative Councils would be established in each province with two-thirds of their members elected on a generous franchise in 1851. Grey implemented the ordinance with such deliberation that neither Council met before advice was received that the United Kingdom Parliament had passed the New Zealand Constitution Act 1852.

This act dissolved these provinces in 1853, after only seven years' existence, and New Munster was divided into the provinces of Wellington, Canterbury, Nelson, and Otago.

Government appointments
 Sir Francis Dillon Bell: Appointed to the Legislative Council of the Province of New Munster.
 Alfred Domett: Colonial Secretary of New Munster.
 Edward John Eyre: Lieutenant-Governor of New Munster.
 Sir William Fox: Attorney-General of New Munster, although his acceptance was later withdrawn.
 William Gisborne: Private secretary to the Lieutenant-Governor of New Munster.
 Sir David Munro: Appointed to the Legislative Council of the Province of New Munster.
 John Davies Ormond: Private secretary to the Lieutenant-Governor of New Munster and Clerk of the New Munster Executive Council.
 Mathew Richmond: Appointed to the Legislative Council of the Province of New Munster.

References

External links
New Munster Armed Police Force
1844 New Munster Inwards Correspondence Register
1848 New Munster Inwards Correspondence Register
Rulers.org
A compendium of official documents relative to native affairs in the South Island, Volume One
A compendium of official documents relative to native affairs in the South Island, Volume Two
The Seal of New Munster

1853 disestablishments
Provinces of New Zealand
South Island
States and territories established in 1846